Luis Genaro Campusano (born September 29, 1998) is an American professional baseball catcher for the San Diego Padres of Major League Baseball (MLB).

Amateur career
Campusano graduated from Cross Creek High School in Augusta, Georgia. He was primarily a first baseman, and did not begin catching until his junior year. As a junior, he batted .493 with six home runs and 33 RBIs. As a senior, he batted .622 with six home runs. He had committed to play college baseball for the Missouri Tigers, but he decommitted and then committed to play for the South Carolina Gamecocks during his senior year. He was selected by the San Diego Padres in the second round (39th overall) of the 2017 Major League Baseball draft and he signed for $1.3 million, forgoing his commitment to South Carolina.

Professional career

After signing, Campusano made his professional debut with the Arizona League Padres. He spent the whole season there, batting .269 with four home runs and 25 RBIs in 37 games. He spent 2018 with the Fort Wayne TinCaps where he slashed .288/.345/.365 with three home runs and forty RBIs in seventy games and was named a Midwest League All-Star. Campusano spent 2019 with the Lake Elsinore Storm, earning California League All-Star honors. Over 110 games, he batted .325/.396/.509 with 15 home runs and 81 RBIs. He was named California League-co MVP (alongside Luis Castro). Following the season, Campusano played for the Peoria Javelinas of the Arizona Fall League.

Campusano was promoted to the major leagues on September 4, 2020, and made his major league debut that night against the Oakland Athletics, going one-for-three with a solo home run off reliever T. J. McFarland. He was placed on the injured list two days later with a wrist sprain, thus ending his season. To begin the 2021 season, Campusano was assigned to the major league roster before being optioned to the El Paso Chihuahuas of the Triple-A West in late April. In June, he was selected to play in the All-Star Futures Game at Coors Field. Over 81 games with El Paso, he slashed .295/.365/.541 with 15 home runs and 45 RBIs. He appeared in 11 games for the Padres, recording three hits over 34 at-bats.

Personal life
Campusano's father, Genaro, signed with the Pittsburgh Pirates as an international free agent in 1989 and spent four years playing in their minor league system.

On October 17, 2020, Campusano was arrested in Grovetown, Georgia and charged with a felony after he was pulled over by police and found to be in possession of 79 grams of marijuana. He was released on a $5,000 bond. The charges against him were dropped in April 2021.

References

External links

1998 births
Living people
Baseball players from Augusta, Georgia
Major League Baseball catchers
American sportspeople of Dominican Republic descent
San Diego Padres players
Arizona League Padres players
Fort Wayne TinCaps players
Lake Elsinore Storm players
Peoria Javelinas players